José Andrés Hernández (born 3 March 1976) is a Mexican former professional boxer who competed from 1997 to 2009.

Life
A native of Ciudad Juárez, Mexico, Hernandez now resides in Round Lake, Illinois.

Amateur career
Jose Hernandez was the winner of the 1997 National Golden Gloves tournament in the 125 lbs division.

Professional career
Hernández made his professional debut less than a month after his Golden Gloves victory, stopping his opponent in the first round. He had an impressive knockout of highly touted prospect Jason Litzau on December 16, 2006. On May 5, 2007 Hernandez was decisioned by Rocky Juarez on the undercard of the Oscar De La Hoya vs. Floyd Mayweather Jr. fight.

External links

References

1976 births
Living people
Boxers from Chihuahua (state)
Sportspeople from Ciudad Juárez
Mexican male boxers
Boxers from Illinois
People from Lake County, Illinois
Super-featherweight boxers